107.7 The Wolf was a British Independent Local Radio station serving Wolverhampton and the surrounding areas, owned and operated by Forever Broadcasting, The Wireless Group and latterly, UTV.

Rebrand
On 7 February 2012, UTV Radio announced the station would be rebranded as Signal 107, following the company's buyout of former MNA stations The Wyre and The Severn, which 107.7 The Wolf both merged with. The rebrand took place at midday on Monday 26 March 2012.

References

Radio stations in the West Midlands (region)
Mass media in Wolverhampton
Radio stations established in 1997
Radio stations disestablished in 2012
Defunct radio stations in the United Kingdom